Paul Farley, FRSL (born 1965) is a British poet, writer and broadcaster.

Life and work
Farley was born in Liverpool. He studied painting at the Chelsea School of Art, and has lived in London, Brighton and Cumbria. His first collection of poetry, The Boy from the Chemist is Here to See You (1998) won a Forward Poetry Prize (Best First Collection) in 1998, and was shortlisted for the Whitbread Prize. The book also gained him the Somerset Maugham Award, and in 1999 he won the Sunday Times Young Writer of the Year Award. From 2000 to 2002 he was the poet-in-residence at the Wordsworth Trust in Grasmere.

His second collection, The Ice Age (2002), received the Whitbread Poetry Award. In 2004, Farley was named as one of the Poetry Book Society's Next Generation poets His third collection, Tramp in Flames(2006), was shortlisted for the Griffin Poetry Prize, a poem from which, ‘Liverpool Disappears for a Billionth of a Second’, was awarded the Forward Prize for Best Individual Poem. The same year he also published a study of Terence Davies' film, Distant Voices, Still Lives. In 2007 he edited a selection of John Clare for Faber's Poet to Poet series.

As a broadcaster he has made many arts, features and documentary programmes for radio and television, as well as original radio dramas, and his poems for radio are collected in Field Recordings:BBC Poems 1998-2008. He makes regular appearances on BBC Radio 4’s Saturday Review, Front Row and BBC Radio 3's The Verb, and he presented the contemporary poetry programme The Echo Chamber on Radio 4 from 2012 to 2018. His book, Edgelands, a non-fiction journey into England’s overlooked wilderness (co-authored with Michael Symmons Roberts) was published by Jonathan Cape in 2011; it received the Royal Society of Literature’s Jerwood Award, the Foyles Best Book of Ideas Award 2012 and was serialised as a BBC Radio 4 Book of the Week. His fourth collection The Dark Film, was a Poetry Book Society Choice in 2012. In 2009 he received the E. M. Forster Award from the American Academy of Arts & Letters. He was elected a Fellow of the Royal Society of Literature in 2012.

He currently lives in Lancashire and is Professor of Poetry at Lancaster University.
His fifth collection The Mizzy has been shortlisted for the 2019 Costa Poetry Award and the T. S. Eliot Prize 2019

Awards
1996 ObserverArvon International Poetry Competition
1998 Geoffrey Dearmer Award
1998 Forward Poetry Prize for Best First Collection, The Boy from the Chemist is Here to See You
1999 Somerset Maugham Award
1999 Sunday Times Young Writer of the Year Award
2000 Arts Council Writer's Award
2002 Whitbread Poetry Award, The Ice Age
2005 Forward Poetry Prize for Best Single Poem, "Liverpool Disappears for a Billionth of a Second"
2007 Griffin International Poetry Prize, shortlist, Tramp in Flames
2009 Royal Society of Literature Jerwood Award for Non-Fiction, Edgelands
2009 E. M. Forster Award (American Academy of Arts & Letters)
2009 Travelling Scholarship of the Society of Authors
2012 Foyles Best Book of Ideas, Edgelands
2012 Fellow of the Royal Society of Literature
2013 Cholmondeley Award of the Society of Authors
2019 T. S. Eliot Prize, shortlist, The Mizzy
2019 Costa Poetry Award, shortlist, The Mizzy

Works

Bibliography
The Boy from the Chemist is Here to See You (London: Picador, 1998) 
The Ice Age (London: Picador, 2002) 
Distant Voices, Still Lives (London: British Film Institute, 2006) (about the film of the same name by Terence Davies) 
Tramp in Flames (London: Picador, 2006)  
Field Recordings: BBC Poems (1998-2008) (London: Donut Press, 2009) 
The Atlantic Tunnel: Selected Poems (New York: Farrar, Straus and Giroux, 2010) 
Edgelands: Journeys into England's True Wilderness (with Michael Symmons Roberts) (London: Jonathan Cape, 2011) 
The Dark Film (London: Picador, 2012) 
Selected Poems (London: Picador, 2014) 
Deaths of the Poets (with Michael Symmons Roberts) (London: Jonathan Cape, 2017) 
The Mizzy (London: Picador, 2019) 
Contributor to A New Divan: A Lyrical Dialogue Between East and West (Gingko Library, 2019). 
Contributor to Refractive Pool: Contemporary Painting in Liverpool (contains The Studio) (Refractive Pool, 2021). 
As Editor

John Clare Selected Poems (London: Faber & Faber, 2010)

References

External links
British Council -- Contemporary Writers: Paul Farley
Poetry Archive--Profile, including audio clips
Griffin Poetry Prize biography, including video clip
Keynote speech at the 2008 Griffin Poetry Prize awards gala, including video clips
Granta 102: The New Nature Writing
The Guardian: In conversation: Mark Haddon and Paul Farley
57 Productions: Interview
57 Productions: Liverpool Disappears for a Billionth of a Second
Intelligent Life: Interview
The Observer: Once upon a life

1965 births
Fellows of the Royal Society of Literature
Living people
Poets from Liverpool
Academics of Lancaster University
21st-century British poets
21st-century English male writers
English male poets